Ralph Stuart Emanuel Donner (February 10, 1943 – April 6, 1984) was an American rock and roll singer. He scored several pop hits in the US in the early 1960s, and had a voice similar to Elvis Presley. His best known song is his 1961 top ten hit, "You Don't Know What You've Got (Until You Lose It)".

Biography

Ralph Donner was born in Norwood Park, Chicago, Illinois, United States, and sang in church as a child. He sang in local talent shows as a teen, and formed two of his own bands, the Rockin' Five and the Gents, in high school. The Rockin' Five played with Sammy Davis, Jr. on Chicago television at one point in the late 1950s. In 1959, he appeared on Alan Freed's Big Beat program, and released a single with the Gents; soon after, the Gents toured with The Sparkletones.

Donner recorded a cover of Presley's "The Girl of My Best Friend", along with a backing band called the Starfires. After being picked up by Gone Records, Donner re-recorded and re-released the tune, which became a nationwide hit; some listeners even thought that the cover was Presley himself. His next single, "You Don't Know What You've Got (Until You Lose It)", became his biggest, and only Top Ten, hit on the Billboard chart in the United States, peaking at No. 4. The track peaked at No. 25 in the UK Singles Chart in 1961. He managed a few more hits, the last of which was in 1962.

In the mid-1960s, Donner recorded for Reprise Records and Red Bird Records, but saw little further success. He played little in the 1970s, recording occasionally, but saw some rekindled interest in his music after Presley's death. In 1981, he provided voice-over narration (in the voice of Elvis) in the film This Is Elvis.

Donner died of lung cancer on April 6, 1984. He was interred in the mausoleum of Acacia Park Cemetery in Norwood Park Township.

Donner was cited by Robert Plant as an influence at the 1995 induction of Led Zeppelin into the Rock and Roll Hall of Fame.

Discography

Singles

Notes
A  "Loveless Life" did not enter the Billboard Hot 100 but peaked on the Bubbling Under Hot 100 Singles chart at number 17.
B  "I Got Burned" did not enter the Billboard Hot 100 but peaked on the Bubbling Under Hot 100 Singles chart at number 24.

References

External links
 Official website

1943 births
1984 deaths
American rock singers
Singers from Chicago
Deaths from lung cancer
20th-century American singers
Burials at Acacia Park Cemetery, Norwood Park Township
20th-century American male singers